The Clash of Times was a tennis exhibition match between Roger Federer and Pete Sampras which took place on 22 November 2007 at Stadium Malawati, Shah Alam, in Kuala Lumpur. Roger won the match by 7/6(6) 7/6(5).

The Clash of Times (Roger Federer vs Pete Sampras)

The Clash of Times was a tennis exhibition match between Roger Federer and Pete Sampras which took place on 22 November 2007 at Stadium Malawati, Shah Alam, in Kuala Lumpur as part of Malaysia's 50th anniversary of independence (it was a part of Inaugural Merdeka Tennis Challenge).

Roger won a close match 7/6(6) 7/6(5).

The “one of a kind” Malaysia Independence Tennis Festival featured three major events:
The first was a challenge match between Rafael Nadal against French top player and Wimbledon semi-finalist Richard Gasquet.
The “center piece” being the Clash of Times challenge match between Roger Federer and Pete Sampras, as well as an ATP Challenger Series tournament – the Malaysia Open.

The Schedule was as follows:

Clash of Titans – Rafael Nadal vs Richard Gasquet (best of 3 sets)
Date: Tuesday, November 20, 2007,
Venue: Malawati Stadium, Shah Alam
Time: 8pm to 10pmClash of Times – Pete Sampras vs Roger Federer (best of 3 sets)
Date: Thursday, November 22, 2007,
Venue: Malawati Stadium, Shah Alam
Time: 8pm to 10pm

Event: Malaysia Open – ATP Challenger Series Tournament
Date: November 17–25, 2007
Format: Men's Singles and Doubles
Venue: National Tennis Centre, Jalan Duta, Kuala Lumpur
Time: 10am to 10pm

External links
 sportspotter.com

References
Malaysia Independence Tennis Festival - sportmalaysia.net
Sampras, Federer prepare to battle - rediff news
The clash of legends: Sampras vs. Federer - digital journal
Federer Edges Sampras In Classic "Clash Of Times" - bernama.com

2007 in Malaysia
Exhibition tennis tournaments